Escharopsis is a genus of bryozoans belonging to the family Umbonulidae.

The species of this genus are found in northern Atlantic Ocean.

Species:

Escharopsis kurilensis 
Escharopsis lobata 
Escharopsis tatarica

References

Bryozoan genera